John of Pavia was Bishop of Pavia.

References

813 deaths
Italian Roman Catholic saints
9th-century Italian bishops
Bishops of Pavia
Year of birth unknown